Kappa Gamma Delta is a professional college sorority for women studying medicine and related professions.

History

Founding 
Kappa Gamma Delta began during the winter quarter of 1993 at the University of California, Davis when students Charlene Tran and Marge Lee envisioned a professional sorority that would provide support for women during the premedical process. They and 10 other women made up the founding class of 12 scholars. Tran and Lee received help from Sigma Mu Delta, a premedical fraternity. During the first meeting on March 3, 1994, in the lounge of Temescal apartments in Davis, twelve women—Maricris Belisario, Chong Choe, Mindy Compton, Pamela Hy, Marge Lee, Kathy Pham, Jennifer Skinkle (now Jennifer Schwartz), Charlene Tran, Gwen Tran, Aileen Tieu, Carolyn Trieu, and Julie Tse—committed themselves to the responsibility and dedication in the construction of this new sorority. With its founding, Kappa Gamma Delta became the first premedical sorority in the United States of America.

Expansion
In Spring 2002, Kappa Gamma Delta was established at the University of California, Berkeley with the initiation efforts of Jo Ann Etorma and Annie Khan, members of the University of California, Davis chapter; and in Winter 2006, at the University of California, Santa Cruz with the initiation efforts of Judy J. He and Sabrina Silva, members of the University of California, Davis chapter. Kappa Gamma Delta was also a co-ed fraternity at California State University Sacramento for a brief time.

Chapters 
Chapter list from the national website. Active chapters noted in bold, inactive chapters noted by italics.

Symbolism and traditions 
The first Coat-of-Arms consisted of an open book, a haystack, the sorority flower, the female symbol, and an Oil lamp. The haystack was later replaced by a torch surrounded by several rings. The founders chose the sorority symbol to be the caduceus, wings, and the female symbol. The sorority song and oath were adopted on June 10, 1994.  The constitution was affirmed May 30, 1994.

While participating in service projects such as the Bay to Breakers and various symposia such as "Life During and After Medical School," the women of Kappa Gamma Delta developed their motto, "Service to Humanity".

Kappa Gamma Delta's Sorority Song was written by Jennifer Skinkle and Charlene Tran:

Kappa Gamma Delta,
Sisterhood Forever.
Educating our Future,
Trusting each other
To make our dreams come true.
Service to Humanity,
We learn responsibility.
With inspiration from our sisters
Doctors we will be.

See also 

 Professional fraternities and sororities

References 

Student organizations established in 1994
1994 establishments in California
Professional medical fraternities and sororities in the United States